The Seminary of the Good Shepherd is the seminary of the Roman Catholic Archdiocese of Sydney, and a number of dioceses from the province of New South Wales and beyond, including the Diocese of Broken Bay, Archdiocese of Canberra and Goulburn, Diocese of Wollongong, Diocese of Maitland-Newcastle and Diocese of Bathurst. The seminary is principally administered by the Archdiocese of Sydney.

History
The first seminary in Sydney was St Patrick's College, Manly, which began in 1889 with a class of twelve students, however, the first efforts at training priests in Sydney can be traced back to the 1830s under Archbishop John Bede Polding. In 1991, due to a declining number of seminarians and a desire to separate the overall seminary formation and the academic formation, consideration was given to finding a new seminary and theological faculty.

In 1993, the Church announced that the Seminary would be vacating the St Patrick's estate site in 1995. At the beginning of the academic year 1996 the Seminary of the Good Shepherd opened at Abbotsford Road, Homebush and the Catholic Institute of Sydney, located on Albert Road, Strathfield came into being shortly after.

Educational scope
The Seminary of the Good Shepherd prepares men for the priesthood, focusing on human, spiritual, pastoral and academic formation. The formation programs runs for seven years.

The seminary students received their academic formation through the neighbouring Catholic Institute of Sydney, where they study alongside lay students.

Former colleges
 St Patrick's Seminary, Manly, New South Wales (built 1889, ceased operating in 1995) now the International College of Management, Sydney
 St Columba's College, Springwood, New South Wales (built 1910, closed 1977), Minor Seminary

Current students
 Shayne D'Cunha, former professional footballer and Australia under 20's player, Seminarian for Diocese of Broken Bay

Former staff
 Danny Meagher, now Auxiliary Bishop of Sydney, Seminary Rector from 2015 to 2020

See also

 Roman Catholic Church in Australia

References

External links
 

Seminaries and theological colleges in Australia
Catholic seminaries
Educational institutions established in 1996
1996 establishments in Australia